Chae Eun-Hee (also Chae Eun-Hui, ; born June 20, 1982) is a South Korean marathon runner. Chae represented South Korea at the 2008 Summer Olympics in Beijing, where she competed in the women's marathon, along with her teammates and fellow runners Lee Eun-Jung and Lee Sun-Young. She successfully finished the race in fifty-third place by twenty-one seconds behind Germany's Susanne Hahn, with a time of 2:38:52.

References

External links

NBC Olympics Profile

South Korean female marathon runners
Living people
Olympic athletes of South Korea
Athletes (track and field) at the 2008 Summer Olympics
1982 births
21st-century South Korean women